Miladhoo (Dhivehi: މިލަދޫ) is one of the inhabited islands that comprises the Noonu Atoll in the Maldives.

Geography

Demography
Historically, Miladhoo was the most developed and most populous island in Noonu Atoll. It is currently the second most populous island in Noonu Atoll.

Governance
Miladhoo is noted for its political activities.

Economy
Most economic activity centres around fishing and tourism, followed by rendering taxi service in Male'.

Education
There is a secondary school named Hidhaayaa school. Until the late 1990s, grade 7 was the highest grade taught on the island. Now students are taught up to grade 10 (O level).

Health
There is a health centre with one doctor and a community health worker.

Sport
Miladhoo is best known as the most successful island in football in the atoll. Miladhoo DX Sports Club won the Zone Champions League in 2004. 

C

Culture
Miladhoo is also famous for its Eid Kulhivaru festivities.
Call for Conservation of Redhinge Funi - Miladhoo, Noonu Atoll
According to the Periodic report prepared  22 May 1986 and presented to UNESCO by National Council for Linguistic and Historical Research in appendix 1. List of Heritage sites on Islands of Maldives as item 28:Miladhoo, Noonu Atoll has two sites.

1- A mound called ‘Us-Gandu"

2- Another mound called “Redhinge Funi’

STATUS

The ziyaaraiy is excluded from this list as the official policy was to restrict other Islamic Sufi practices than the official doctrine. these photos were taken in June 27, 2009 tells the story of neglect, the archeological site 'redhinge funi’ which has a type of ficus growing on the top of the mound, the roots are exposed as soil is eroded possibly by the waves washing onto the shore. This sites needs urgent conservation.

References

Islands of the Maldives